The 2021–22 season is the 125th season of competitive football by Heart of Midlothian. It is the club's first season of play back in the top tier of Scottish football since 2020, having been promoted from the Scottish Championship at the end of the previous season, having played just one season in the Scottish Championship. The club had been relegated from the Premiership at the end of the 2019–20 season. 

They also competed in this season's Scottish Cup and Scottish League Cup.

Results and fixtures

Pre-season / Friendlies

Scottish Premiership

League Cup

Scottish Cup

First team player statistics

Captains
Craig Gordon was appointed captain for the 2021–22 season, taking over from Steven Naismith who retired at the end of the previous season. Naismith took on a coaching role at the club.
{| class="wikitable" style="font-size: 95%; text-align: center;"
|-
! style="background:maroon; color:white;" scope="col" width=60|No
! style="background:maroon; color:white;" scope="col" width=60|Pos
! style="background:maroon; color:white;" scope="col" width=60|Country
! style="background:maroon; color:white;" scope="col" width=150|Name
! style="background:maroon; color:white;" scope="col" width=80|No of games
|-
|1|||GK||||Gordon||45
|-
|4|||DF||||Souttar||1
|-
|5|||MF||||Haring||1

Squad information
During the 2021–22 campaign, Hearts used thirty players in competitive games. The table below shows the number of appearances and goals scored by each player.
{| class="wikitable" style="font-size: 100%; text-align: center;"
|-
! style="background:maroon; color:white;" scope="col" rowspan="2" width="10%" align="center"|Number
! style="background:maroon; color:white;" scope="col" rowspan="2" width="10%" align="center"|Position
! style="background:maroon; color:white;" scope="col" rowspan="2" width="10%" align="center"|Nation
! style="background:maroon; color:white;" scope="col" rowspan="2" width="20%" align="center"|Name
! style="background:maroon; color:white;" scope="col" colspan="2" align="center"|Totals
! style="background:maroon; color:white;" scope="col" colspan="2" align="center"|Premiership
! style="background:maroon; color:white;" scope="col" colspan="2" align="center"|League Cup
! style="background:maroon; color:white;" scope="col" colspan="2" align="center"|Scottish Cup
|-
! style="background:maroon; color:white;" scope="col" width=60 align="center"|Apps
! style="background:maroon; color:white;" scope="col" width=60 align="center"|Goals
! style="background:maroon; color:white;" scope="col" width=60 align="center"|Apps
! style="background:maroon; color:white;" scope="col" width=60 align="center"|Goals
! style="background:maroon; color:white;" scope="col" width=60 align="center"|Apps
! style="background:maroon; color:white;" scope="col" width=60 align="center"|Goals
! style="background:maroon; color:white;" scope="col" width=60 align="center"|Apps
! style="background:maroon; color:white;" scope="col" width=60 align="center"|Goals
|-
|-

 

 

 
 

  
  

 

        

 

 
Appearances (starts and substitute appearances) and goals include those in the Scottish Premiership, League Cup and the Scottish Cup.

Disciplinary record
During the 2021–22 season, Hearts players have so far been issued eighty three yellow cards and three red cards. The table below shows the number of cards and type shown to each player.
Last updated 22 May 2022

Goal scorers
Last updated 14 May 2021

Assists
Last updated 14 May 2021

Clean sheets
{| class="wikitable" style="font-size: 95%; text-align: center;"
|-
! style="background:maroon; color:white;" scope="col" width=60|
! style="background:maroon; color:white;" scope="col" width=60|
! style="background:maroon; color:white;" scope="col" width=60|
! style="background:maroon; color:white;" scope="col" width=150|Name
! style="background:maroon; color:white;" scope="col" width=80|Premiership
! style="background:maroon; color:white;" scope="col" width=80|League Cup
! style="background:maroon; color:white;" scope="col" width=80|Scottish Cup
! style="background:maroon; color:white;" scope="col" width=80|Total
|-
|1
|GK
|
|Craig Gordon
|14
|4
|2
|20
|-
! colspan=4 | Total
!14||4||2||20

Team statistics

League table

League Cup table

Division summary

Management statistics
Last updated 22 May 2022

Club

International selection

Over the course of the season a number of the Hearts squad were called up on international duty. Craig Gordon, John Souttar and Craig Halkett were called up to represent Scotland, whilst Michael Smith was selected to represent Northern Ireland and Ben Woodburn to represent Wales. Nathaniel Atkinson was later called up to represent Australia.

Transfers

Players in

Players out

Loans in

Loans out

Contract extensions
The following players extended their contracts with the club over the course of the season.

See also
List of Heart of Midlothian F.C. seasons

Notes

References

2021–22
Scottish football clubs 2021–22 season